was a railway station in Misato, Ōchi District, Shimane Prefecture, Japan, operated by West Japan Railway Company (JR West).

Lines

Layout
The station has one side platform serving a single bi-directional track.

Adjacent stations

History
On 16 October 2015, JR West announced that it was considering closing the Sanko Line due to poor patronage. On 29 September 2016, JR West announced that the entire line would close on 31 March 2018. The line then closed on March 31, 2018, with an event hosted by JR West.

See also
 List of railway stations in Japan

References

External links

  

Railway stations in Japan opened in 1975
Railway stations in Shimane Prefecture
Railway stations closed in 2018